Dinophyton is an extinct genus of gymnosperm found in late Triassic beds in North America. Its taxonomy is debated, but it may be a gnetophyte with bisaccate pollen.

References 

Triassic plants
Prehistoric gymnosperm genera